Jimmy Roy (born September 22, 1975 in Sioux Lookout, Ontario) is a former Canadian ice hockey player for the Manitoba Moose of the International Hockey League and American Hockey League from 1997 to 2006. Later in his career he played for Iserlohn Roosters of the Deutsche Eishockey Liga from 2006 to 2011. He became director of player development for the Winnipeg Jets of the National Hockey League in 2011.

Playing career

Roy was drafted 254th overall by the Dallas Stars in the 1994 NHL Entry Draft but never played in the National Hockey League. After spending two years at Michigan Technological University he signed with the Manitoba Moose in 1997. Roy spent nine seasons with the Manitoba Moose, the first four in the International Hockey League and the rest in the American Hockey League after the Moose became members of the league when the IHL folded. He held several team records including games played and most goals, and his number was retired by the team in February 2020. For the 2006–07 season Roy signed with the Iserlohn Roosters of the Deutsche Eishockey Liga.

In Iserlohn he developed to a key player, known for his leadership qualities on and off the ice. He also helped the club to sign some former Moose players like Ryan Ready and Pat Kavanagh. Roy extended his contract after his first season in Germany for two years. On Christmas Day 2008 the Roosters announced again that Roy had signed for two more years. As a Rooster he usually played on a line with Ryan Ready. In the 2007–08 season their center was Pat Kavanagh, the next season Bob Wren was their linemate. In 2011, he retired as a player to take the position of director of player development in the Winnipeg Jets organization.

Career statistics

Awards
 2002–03 Yanick Dupre Memorial Award
 2006 AHL All-Star Game

References

External links

1975 births
Canadian ice hockey left wingers
Dallas Stars draft picks
Ice hockey people from Ontario
Iserlohn Roosters players
Living people
Manitoba Moose players
Manitoba Moose (IHL) players
Michigan Tech Huskies men's ice hockey players
People from Sioux Lookout
Thunder Bay Flyers players
Winnipeg Jets coaches
Canadian expatriate ice hockey players in Germany
Canadian ice hockey coaches